California is rich in dance history. In classical ballet, California is home to the oldest professional ballet company in the United States. The San Francisco Ballet, founded as the San Francisco Opera Ballet in 1933, predates both American Ballet Theater and New York City ballet. Barbara Crockett founded the Sacramento Ballet in 1954  and hosted the first festival for the Pacific Western Region of Regional Dance America in 1966. In modern dance, Ruth St. Denis established her second school in the Hollywood area of Los Angeles in 1940 while Lester Horton created the Horton Dance Group in 1934, also in Los Angeles. Ann Halprin founded the San Francisco Dancers’ Workshop in 1950 and continues to live and work in the San Francisco Bay Area. The Bay Area in also home to Alonzo King's Lines Ballet and Oberlin Dance Collective.



Timeline

1910-1920 
 Denishawn School of Dancing and Related Arts Founded (1915)
 Martha Graham attends Denishawn School

1920-1930 
 San Francisco War Memorial Opera House Opens (1932)

1930-1940 
 San Francisco Opera Ballet (1933)

1940-1950 
 Horton Dance Group (1934)

1950-1960 
 San Francisco Dancers' Workshop (1950)
 Sacramento Ballet (1954)

1960-1970 
 Dorothy Chandler Pavilion (1954)

1970-1980 
 Oberlin Dance Collective

1980-1990 
 Lines Ballet (1982)

Company Listing

Professional Ballet Companies

San Francisco 
 San Francisco Ballet
 Lines Ballet
 Smuin Ballet

Greater Bay Area 
 Ballet San Jose Silicon Valley
 Oakland Ballet
 Company C Contemporary Ballet

North San Joaquin Valley 
 The Sacramento Ballet
 Folsom Lake Civic Ballet

Northern Sierra Foothills 
 Placer Theatre Ballet

Professional Modern/Contemporary Companies

San Francisco 
 ODC
 Robert Moses's Kin

North San Joaquin Valley 
 Core Contemporary Dance

Schools

Ballet/Dance Schools

Northern California 
 San Francisco Ballet School
 The School (Sacramento Ballet)
 Marin Ballet

Southern California 
 Coburn School

RDA (Regional Dance America) Members 
Crockett-Deane Ballet
Dance Connection Ballet Company
Juline Regional Youth Ballet
Long Beach Ballet
Maple Youth Ballet
Marin Ballet
Paso Robles Chamber Ballet
North Coast Ballet California
Sacramento Ballet Youth Ensemble
Santa Barbara Festival Ballet
Santa Cruz Ballet Theatre
South Bay Ballet
State Street Ballet Young Dancers

Degree Programs 

*BFA in Choreography/Performance

Native Dancers 
Isadora Duncan
Maia Wilkins
Jodie Gates
Sascha Radetsky

References

External Resources 
 http://www.dancehistoryproject.org/article/articles/chronologies/ballet-chronologies/